"Underneath the Radar" is a song by English electronic music group Underworld, released from their debut album, Underneath the Radar (1988), in 1988. It was featured prominently in the fifth-season premiere of Miami Vice, during the opening aerial shots of Miami and subsequent nightclub shootout. The Morse code in the first 30 seconds of the song reads "Think global, act local". Commercially, the song reached number two in South Africa, number five in Australia, number 14 in New Zealand, number 69 in Canada, and number 74 in the United States.

Big Brother Australia 2006 contestant Danielle Foote also released a cover of the song in 2006, which reached number 41 on the ARIA Singles Chart.

Track listings
7-inch and cassette single
A. "Underneath the Radar" (edit)
B. "Big Red X"

UK 12-inch single
A1. "Underneath the Radar" (8:00 remix)
B1. "Underneath the Radar" (6:00 dub)
B2. "Big Red X"

International 12-inch single
A1. "Underneath the Radar" (12-inch remix) – 8:00
A2. "Underneath the Radar" (instrumental) – 6:35
B1. "Big Red X" – 4:59
B2. "Underneath the Radar" (dub) – 6:00

Charts

Underworld version

Weekly charts

Year-end charts

Danielle version

References

Underworld (band) songs
1988 debut singles
1988 songs
2006 debut singles
British synth-pop songs
Sire Records singles
Song recordings produced by Rupert Hine
Songs written by Karl Hyde
Songs written by Rick Smith (musician)